Torch plant is a common name for several plants and may refer to:

Aloe arborescens
Aristaloe aristata
Billbergia pyramidalis (flaming torch plant)